Rayong is a city located in the Gulf of Thailand. The name may also refer to:
Rayong Province
Amphoe Mueang Rayong or Mueang Rayong district
Rayong River